Fedyashino is a rural locality (a village) in Vereshchaginsky District, Perm Krai, Russia.  The population was 106 as of 2010.

Geography 
Fedyashino is located 36 km west of Vereshchagino (the district's administrative centre) by road. Martely is the nearest rural locality.

References 

Rural localities in Vereshchaginsky District